Two Ocean Glacier is in Glacier National Park in the U.S. state of Montana.

References

See also
 List of glaciers in the United States
 Glaciers in Glacier National Park (U.S.)

Glaciers of Flathead County, Montana
Glaciers of Glacier National Park (U.S.)
Glaciers of Montana